Šid can refer to:

 Šid, town and municipality in Serbia
Šid railway station
 Šid, Lučenec, village in Slovakia